The Queen of Hearts is a collaborative studio album by English musician Olivia Chaney and American band The Decemberists, under their project name Offa Rex. It was released in July 2017 under Nonesuch Records.

The album was nominated for Best Folk Album at the 60th Annual Grammy Awards in 2018.

Track listing

Charts

References

2017 albums
Nonesuch Records albums
The Decemberists albums
Olivia Chaney albums